The 2019 Wisconsin Spring Election was held in the U.S. state of Wisconsin on April 2, 2019.  There was one seat on the Wisconsin Supreme Court on the ballot, as well as several other nonpartisan local and judicial elections.  There were also a number of local referendums for school funding.  The 2019 Wisconsin Spring Primary was held February 19, 2019.

There was an additional special election held in the 64th Wisconsin State Assembly district.

In the Supreme Court election, the Republicans' preferred candidate defeated the Democrats' preferred candidate.  In all, only 1 incumbent judge lost their seat in this election, while 2 others retired.

Election information

Turnout
Turnout in the April 2 election was 27% of the voting age population.

State elections

Legislative

State Assembly 64th district special election
A special election was held to fill the 64th district seat of the Wisconsin State Assembly. The seat was vacated by former Wisconsin Assembly Minority Leader Peter Barca who had been appointed to the cabinet of Governor Tony Evers.  At the time of the election, the 64th Assembly district contained the northern half of the city of Kenosha, along with suburban areas of southeastern Racine County. It is considered a safe democratic seat.

The primary for this seat was held at the spring general election on April 2. Democrat Tip McGuire defeated Gina Walkington and Spencer Zimmerman for the Democratic nomination while Mark Stalker won the Republican nomination unopposed. The special general election was then held April 30, and McGuire defeated Stalker 62.35% to 37.56%.

Judicial
Judicial elections were held in 2019.

State Supreme Court 

A regularly-scheduled Wisconsin Supreme Court election was held April 2. Incumbent Shirley Abrahamson did not seek reelection.

Republican-backed Brian Hagedorn narrowly defeated Democratic-backed Lisa Neubauer.

Candidates
Brian Hagedorn, judge of the Wisconsin Court of Appeals District II division and former chief legal counsel to Governor Scott Walker
Lisa Neubauer, chief judge of the Wisconsin Court of Appeals

Results

State Court of Appeals 
Three seats on the Wisconsin Court of Appeals were up for election in 2019.  All three were uncontested.
 Judge Mark Gundrum was unopposed seeking re-election to a second full term in District II.
 Judge Lisa K. Stark was unopposed seeking re-election to a second full term in District III.
 In District IV, Administrative Law Judge Jennifer E. Nashold was unopposed in the election to succeed retiring judge Paul Lundsten.

State Circuit Courts 
Twenty nine of the state's 249 circuit court seats were up for election in 2019.  Only three of those seats were contested.  Only one incumbent was defeated for re-election—Milwaukee County Circuit Judge Andrew A. Jones, who had been appointed a year earlier by Governor Scott Walker to fill the vacancy created by Judge Rebecca Dallet's elevation to the Wisconsin Supreme Court.

Local elections

Appleton
 Incumbent Outagamie County Executive Tom Nelson was reelected without opposition.

Green Bay
 In Green Bay's mayoral election, Republican four-term incumbent Jim Schmitt was not a candidate for re-election.  He was succeeded by Democrat Eric Genrich, who had previously represented Green Bay in the Wisconsin State Assembly.  Genrich defeated Patrick Buckley, a small business owner.

Madison
 In Madison's mayoral election, seven-term Mayor Paul Soglin was defeated by Satya Rhodes-Conway.

Racine
 In Racine's mayoral election, incumbent Mayor Cory Mason won his first full term.  Mason had previously won a special election to fill the remainder of the term of Mayor John Dickert, who had resigned.  Mason defeated a write-in campaign by Racine city councilmember Sandy Weidner.

School referendums
 There were 60 local education-funding referendums on the ballot in the 2019 election, at a total value of approximately $1.2 billion.  45 of those referendums passed, awarding the school districts approximately $783 million in additional funding.

References 

 
Wisconsin